László Kaszás Kaszner (born 18 February 1938) is a former Hungarian football player.

Career
Born in Budapest, Kaszás began playing football with local side Vasas.

At age 17, Kaszás went to Spain to play for Barcelona in 1957. He later signed for Real Madrid, but did not play any league matches for the club. Next, he signed with La Liga side Racing de Santander in 1960.

A year later, Kaszás joined Serie A side Venezia and spent one season with the club before returning to Spain. Back in Spain, he would play one season in the Segunda División with CD Constancia, followed by two seasons with RCD Espanyol in La Liga. Next, he returned to the second division to play two seasons for UE Lleida.

Kaszás would spend the following two years playing in the United States, in the North American Soccer League with Philadelphia Spartans, Saint Louis Stars and New York Generals. Before retiring, he signed a one-year contract with CD Tarrasa.

References

External links
 Profile at NASL Soccer
 
 Biography

1938 births
Living people
Footballers from Budapest
Hungarian footballers
Vasas SC players
Venezia F.C. players
Racing de Santander players
CE Constància players
RCD Espanyol footballers
UE Lleida players
Philadelphia Spartans players
St. Louis Stars (soccer) players
New York Generals players
National Professional Soccer League (1967) players
North American Soccer League (1968–1984) players
Expatriate footballers in Italy
Expatriate footballers in Spain
Expatriate soccer players in the United States
Association football forwards
Association football midfielders